Below are the rosters for teams competing in the 2023 World Junior Ice Hockey Championships.

Group A

Head coach:  Marco Pewal

Head coach:  Dennis Williams

INJ:  Owen Beck was named as an injury replacement for Colton Dach midway through the tournament.

Head coach:  Radim Rulík

Head coach:  Tobias Abstreiter

Head coach:  Magnus Hävelid

Group B

Head coach:  Tomi Lämsä

Head coach:  Artis Ābols

Head coach:  Ivan Feneš

Head coach:  Marco Bayer

Head coach:  Rand Pecknold

References

External links
WM20 - International Ice Hockey Federation

Rosters
World Junior Ice Hockey Championships rosters